Brian André Doyle was a lawyer who was Attorney General of Fiji and Chief Justice of Zambia.

He served in Fiji as Solicitor General from 1948 to 1951, and as Attorney General from 1949 to 1956 (his tenure in these two offices evidently overlapped).

Later he was Chief Justice of Zambia from 1969 to 1975. He went on to serve two terms as a Judge of the Botswana Court of Appeal (1973 to 1979, and 1988 to 1991).

He died in Brazil at the home of his son. He also had a daughter there.

References

1911 births
2004 deaths
People educated at Douai School
Alumni of Trinity College Dublin
Attorneys General of the Colony of Fiji
Attorneys-general of Fiji
Solicitors-General of Fiji
Attorneys-General of Northern Rhodesia
Members of the Legislative Council of Northern Rhodesia
Members of the Legislative Council of Fiji
Chief justices of Zambia
People from Mawlamyine
Burmese people of Irish descent
British judges on the courts of Zambia
British judges on the courts of Botswana
British expatriates in Fiji
Colony of Fiji people
Expatriate judges from Ireland
Justice Ministers of Zambia
British people in British Burma